The McAllister Covered Bridge is a Burr Arch structure that was built by Joseph A. Britton and Son in 1914. It is found in Adams Township, Parke County, Indiana, United States.

It was added to the National Register of Historic Places in 1978.

Gallery

See also
 List of Registered Historic Places in Indiana
 Parke County Covered Bridges
 Parke County Covered Bridge Festival

References

Covered bridges on the National Register of Historic Places in Parke County, Indiana
Bridges completed in 1914
Historic district contributing properties in Indiana
Wooden bridges in Indiana
Burr Truss bridges in the United States